Pradesh refers to a province or territory in various South Asian languages. It derives from the Sanskrit प्रदेश pradeśa, meaning "sub-region" or "sub-country". The same word was borrowed into:
 Thai as ประเทศ prathet,
 Lao as ປະເທດ pathet and
 Khmer as ប្រទេស prâtés ,
meaning "nation" or "country".

States of India
There are five Indian states whose official name bears the word pradesh:
 Andhra Pradesh, Land of the Andhras
 Arunachal Pradesh, Aruna/Arunachal = Land of the Rising Sun or Land of the dawn-lit mountains
 Himachal Pradesh, Hima/Himachal = Land of the Snow
 Madhya Pradesh, Central Province, replacing the former Central Provinces and Berar which was later renamed as Madhya Bharat
 Uttar Pradesh, Northern Province, although not the north-most province; it was formerly the United Provinces of Agra and Oudh which was later renamed as United Provinces

It is also found in the names of three proposed states:
 Harit Pradesh, Green Province, part of a proposed division of Uttar Pradesh
 Maru Pradesh, Desert Province, part of a proposed division of Rajasthan
 Vindhya Pradesh, Land of the Vindhya, former state merged into Madhya Pradesh in 1956

Provinces of Nepal
 Bagmati Pradesh 
 Gandaki Pradesh
 Karnali Pradesh
 Kosi Pradesh (proposed name)
 Lumbini Pradesh
 Madhesh Pradesh
 Sudurpashchim Pradesh

See also
 Desh (disambiguation)
 Desi
 -stan 
 Parish
 Pradesh Congress Committee

Types of administrative division